Graham Smith is an artist,  based in  He has exhibited for the last 25 years.

Early life

Smith was born in Vancouver, British Columbia.

Projects

Smith directed the VRAAP program (Virtual Reality Artist Access Program) at the McLuhan Program in Culture and Technology at the University of Toronto.

References

External links
 Cybercity Ruhr
 http://www.grahamsmithartist.com/ARTIST/artist.html
 Liveform Telekinetics telepresence art project between Canada and The Netherlands
 Telepresence art project between Sweden and Canada
 Utopia Machen - Cybercity Viehofer Strasse
 Mobi - DEAF 2007
 Morphing Machinery DEAF 2007- long version in German
 http://www.youtube.com/watch?v=uVJFsSd6v2o (Short version)
 http://www.youtube.com/watch?v=jbG5knuhOP8

Living people
Artists from Vancouver
Canadian conceptual artists
Academic staff of the Utrecht School of the Arts
Year of birth missing (living people)